Fuesslinia amoena is a fossil species of beetles in the family Buprestidae, the only species in the genus Fuesslinia.

References

Monotypic Buprestidae genera